Mauricio Andrés Pozo Quinteros (born 16 August 1970) is a retired Chilean football defender and current manager.

Career
Pozo has been capped four times for the national team. He even represented Chile in the 2001 Copa América held in Colombia.

Personal life
His younger brother, Pablo, and his father, Juan, are former professional referees as well as his youngest brother, Nicolás. Pablo officiated in the 2010 FIFA World Cup.

He is also the son-in-law of the former Chile international footballer and manager Guillermo Páez.

Honours

Club
Deportes Concepción
 Segunda División de Chile (1): 1994

References

External links

Mauricio Pozo at playmakerstats.com (English version of ceroacero.es)

1970 births
Living people
People from Cachapoal Province
Chilean footballers
Chile international footballers
2001 Copa América players
Deportes Magallanes footballers
Magallanes footballers
Deportes Concepción (Chile) footballers
Rangers de Talca footballers
Unión Española footballers
Cobreloa footballers
Santiago Morning footballers
Primera B de Chile players
Chilean Primera División players
Association football defenders
Chilean football managers
San Marcos de Arica managers
Santiago Morning managers
Primera B de Chile managers